Tecno Camon 15 Air, Tecno Camon 15, Tecno Camon 15 Pro and Tecno Camon 15 Premier are Android-based smartphones manufactured, released and marketed by Tecno Mobile as part of Tecno Camon 15 series. The device were unveiled during an online event held on 2 April 2020 due to the COVID-19 pandemic as successors to Tecno Camon 12 series. It is the seventh generation of Tecno's Camon Series of smartphones.

The Camon 15 Air, Camon 15, Camon 15 Pro and Camon 15 Premier is an upgraded version of Camon 12 series, coming with different features, including the OS, storage, camera, display and battery capacity. The phone has received generally favorable reviews, with critics mostly noting the better camera setup and bigger battery. Critics, however, still criticize the lack of fast charging and missing USB Type-C port.

Specifications

Hardware
The Camon 15 Air and Camon 15 feature a 720p resolution with an 20:9 aspect ratio, while the Camon 15 Pro and Camon 15 Premier feature a 1080p resolution with an 19.5:9 aspect ratio. All the Camon 15 series, features a display size of 6.6-inches; the Camon 15 Air and Camon 15 has IPS Dot-in display, making it the first Tecno device to come with a dot in-display front camera (punch hole) and a front LED flashlight, while the Camon 15 Pro and Camon 15 Premier features a FHD+ display without the usual notches, making it the first Tecno device to feature such. Camon 15 Air and Camon 15 come with a MediaTek Helio P22 SoC, Camon 15 Pro comes with MediaTek Helio P35, while Camon 15 Premier comes with MediaTek W Helio P35. The Camon 15 Air comes with 3 GB of RAM, the Camon 15 comes with 4 GB of RAM, while the Camon 15 Pro and Camon 15 Premier both come with 6 GB of RAM. Camon 15 Air and Camon 15 both come with 64 GB storage, while Camon 15 Pro and Camon 15 Premier come with 128 GB storage. Camon 15 Air and Camon 15 feature the ability to use a microSD card to expand the storage to a maximum of 256 GB, while Camon 15 Pro and Camon 15 Premier can be expanded to 512 GB. The Camon 15 Air and Camon 15 come with the battery capacities of 5000 mAh, while the Camon 15 Pro and Camon 15 Premier come with the battery capacity of 4000 mAh. The cameras on the Camon 15 series improved considerably over its predecessors, the Camon 12 is equipped with three rear sensors whilst the Camon 15 has four rear sensors. The Camon 15 series comes with an LED flash and AI scene detection. The Camon 15 Pro and Camon 15 Premier comes with a pop-up selfie camera, making it the first Tecno device to come with such.

Software
All the devices ship with Android 10 with a new HiOS 6.0, unlike the versions found on Camon 12 series. The HiOS 6.0 features a system-wide Dark Theme, Social Turbo and Game mode.

Reception 
Dolapo Iyunade from TechCity gave the Camon 15 a score of 3.8/5, stating that the device has good battery life and large display, however, she complained of the missing USB Type-C port, but opined that it still makes for a good device.

Busayo Omotimehin from Phones Corridor praised the Camon 15 Premier design, display, battery and camera, but wished that the device had a USB Type-C port and super-fast charger out of the box.

Kenn Abuya from Techweez gave a positive review of the Camon 15, noting that the screen is big enough for consuming media content and browsing, he went further to state that the camera is a notable improvement from the Camon 12 by sheer numbers, while praising the battery capacity, but noted that the charging speed is slow due to lack of fast charging technology.

Meenu Rana from The Mobile Indian praised the Camon 15 Pro as one of the best-designed smartphones from Tecno, stressing that the camera looks impressive. He went further to express his concerns, noting that the software needs improvements.

Chetan Nayak from Boy Genius Report gave a positive review of Camon 15 Pro, stating that the device come with unique features and compromises, he went further to praise the device's pop-up camera, stressing that the device has a decent camera performance and good looks and many software-backed features. He criticized the lack of a USB Type-C port.

References 

Android (operating system) devices
Tecno smartphones
Mobile phones introduced in 2020